Azad (also Romanized as Āzād; also known as Sāsūkī-ye Āzād) is a village in Dust Mohammad Rural District, in the Central District of Hirmand County, Sistan and Baluchestan Province, Iran. At the 2006 census, its population was 238, in 44 families.

References 

Populated places in Hirmand County